The 2017 Tyrone Senior Football Championship is the 112th edition of Tyrone GAA's premier gaelic football tournament for clubs in Tyrone Senior Football League Division 1. Sixteen teams compete with the winners receiving the O'Neill Cup and representing Tyrone in the Ulster Senior Club Football Championship.

Killyclogher were the defending champions after they defeated Coalisland after a replay in the 2016 final. However the defence of their title came undone at the first hurdle when losing to newly promoted Pomeroy Plunkett's in Round 1.

Pomeroy Plunkett's, Urney St. Columba's and Donaghmore St. Patrick's returned to senior championship football in 2017.

This year marked the first time a Tyrone championship game was played outside the county. Omagh St. Enda's defeated Ardboe O'Donovan Rossa in a first round re-fixture tie in the Athletic Grounds, Armagh. Healy Park was ruled out due to Omagh's involvement and no neutral floodlit venue was available.

Greencastle St. Patrick's made the drop back down to the Intermediate ranks when finishing bottom of the 2017 S.F.L. They were followed by Strabane Sigersons who lost their S.F.L. Relegation Playoff to Urney St. Columba's, who in turn then lost their SFL/IFL promotion/relegation playoff to Aghyaran St. Davog's. I.F.C. champions Moy Tír na nÓg and I.F.L. champions Derrylaughan Kevin Barry's will also replace these relegated teams in 2018.

On 15 October 2017, Omagh St. Enda's claimed their 9th S.F.C. crown and first in three years when defeating Errigal Ciarán by 0-10 to 0-8 at Healy Park.

Format
The championship has a straight knock out structure. The 16 teams that  take part in the championship are the 16 teams in the Senior Football League (SFL).

Relegation from SFC:

Either two or three teams are relegated each year from the SFC and SFL. The 16th placed team in the SFL is automatically relegated to the IFL. The 15th and 14th placed teams then play a SFL relegation playoff with the loser being relegated. The winner plays the winner of the IFL promotion playoffs - if they win, they remain in the SFC and  SFL - if they lose they are relegated to the IFC and IFL. (The winner of the SFC can't be relegated. If the championship winner finishes in the bottom 3 in the league, the 13th placed team enters the relegation scenario.)

Promotion to SFC:

Either two or three teams are promoted to the SFC each year. The IFC champions and the IFL champions are automatically promoted to the senior grade (If a team wins the IFC and IFL, the 2nd placed team in the IFL are automatically promoted). 2nd, 3rd, 4th and 5th place in the IFL enter the IFL promotion semi-finals (If the IFC champions are placed in the top 5 the 6th placed team enter the IFL promotion semi-finals) with the eventual winner of the final earning the right to play the loser of the SFL relegation playoff in a relegation/promotion playoff.

Team Changes
The following teams have changed division since the 2016 championship season.

To S.F.C.
Promoted from 2016 Tyrone I.F.C.
 Pomeroy Plunkett's - (IFC Champions)
 Urney St. Columba's - (SFL/IFL promotion/relegation playoff Winner)
 Donaghmore St. Patrick's - (IFL Champions)

From S.F.C.
Relegated to 2017 I.F.C.
 Eglish St. Patrick's - (SFL/IFL promotion/relegation playoff Loser)
 Augher St. Macartan's - (SFL Relegation Loser)
 Kildress Wolfe Tones- (16th in SFL)

First round

Quarter-finals

Semi-finals

Final

Ulster Senior Club Football Championship

References

Tyrone Senior Football Championship
Tyrone Senior Football Championship